Fezia is a genus of flowering plants belonging to the family Brassicaceae.

Its native range is Northwestern Africa.

Species:
 Fezia pterocarpa Pit.

References

Brassicaceae
Brassicaceae genera